Georgios Georgiadis (born 14 November 1987) is a Greek professional footballer who plays as a winger.

Club career

PAOK 
Georgiadis made his debut for the club on 4 August 2011 in a Europa League qualifier against Vålerenga in which PAOK won 3–0. Georgiadis scored his first league goal for PAOK against AEK Athens on 29 January 2012 in a 2–0 away win.
On 30 November 2011, he set up both goals for Dimitris Salpingidis and Stefanos Athanasiadis in the famous 2–1 win over Tottenham Hotspur at White Hart Lane.

Veria 

On August 19, 2014 Georgiadis signed a contract with the Greek team Veria.

AEL Limassol 
On 23 August 2016, Georgiadis signed with Cypriot First Division club AEL Limassol a year contract for an undisclosed fee.

Ermis Aradippou 
On 31 August 2017, Georgiadis signed with Cypriot First Division club Ermis Aradippou a year contract for an undisclosed fee.

Doxa Drama
On 31 January 2018, he signed with Football League club Doxa Dramas.

Keşla
On 12 September 2018, he signed with Azerbaijani football club Keşla FK that currently plays in the Azerbaijan Premier League.

Elazığspor
On the last day of the January transfermarket 2019, Georgiadis was one of 22 players on two hours, that signed for Turkish club Elazığspor. had been placed under a transfer embargo but managed to negotiate it with the TFF First League, leading to them going on a mad spree of signing and registering a load of players despite not even having a permanent manager in place. In just two hours, they managed to snap up a record 22 players - 12 coming in on permanent contracts and a further 10 joining on loan deals until the end of the season.

International career
After his impressive performances at Panserraikos Georgiadis was called up to the Greece national football team for a friendly match against Austria in November 2010 where he made his debut.

Career statistics

Honours

Panserraikos
Football League:  2007–08

PAOK
Superleague: Runner-up (2) 2012–13, 2013–14
Greek Cup: Runner-up 2013–14

References

External links 
 

1987 births
People from Kapetan Mitrousi
Living people
Greek footballers
Greek expatriate footballers
Greece international footballers
Panserraikos F.C. players
PAOK FC players
Veria F.C. players
AEL Limassol players
Shamakhi FK players
Elazığspor footballers
Apollon Paralimnio F.C. players
Azerbaijan Premier League players
TFF First League players
Super League Greece players
Football League (Greece) players
Cypriot First Division players
Expatriate footballers in Cyprus
Greek expatriate sportspeople in Cyprus
Association football forwards
Footballers from Central Macedonia